South Carolina Highway 112 (SC 112) was a state highway that existed entirely in Union. It connected Carlisle with Union.

Route description
SC 112 began at an intersection with SC 215 and SC 215 Alternate (SC 215 Alt.) in Carlisle. It traveled to the northwest and met U.S. Route 176 (US 176). The two highways began a concurrency at that point. The two highways traveled to the north-northwest and entered Union. In the city, they first met the northern terminus of SC 921. Then, they met SC 92 and the western terminus of SC 91 (both now part of SC 49). Here, SC 92 joined the concurrency. In the northern part of the city, it split off, with US 176 and SC 112 heading to the west. Northwest of the city, SC 112 left the U.S. Highway and traveled to the northwest and then reached its northern terminus, an intersection with SC 115 in Mean Crossroads (southwest of Jonesville).

History
SC 112 was established in 1940. It was decommissioned in 1947. Most of its path was downgraded to secondary roads. Today, it is known as Fishdam Avenue and Berry Farm Road between Carlisle and the southern end of its concurrency with US 176 and Meansville Road between Union and Mean Crossroads.

Major intersections

See also

References

External links
Former SC 112 at the Virginia Highways South Carolina Annex

112
Transportation in Union County, South Carolina